The vaginal flora in pregnancy, or vaginal microbiota in pregnancy, is different from the vaginal flora (the population of microorganisms that resides in the vagina) before sexual maturity, during reproductive years, and after menopause. A description of the vaginal flora of pregnant women who are immunocompromised is not covered in this article. The composition of the vaginal flora significantly differs in pregnancy. Bacteria or viruses that are infectious most often have no symptoms.

Normal microbiota

Microbiota in pregnancy
In normal pregnancy, the resident vaginal flora is thought to provide protection against infection. The microbiota during pregnancy is predominantly Lactobacillus spp.  Microbiota composition can change during the course of the pregnancy.  If the microbiota populations become more diverse, indicating that the normal Lactobacillus-dominated population has changed to a bacterial vaginosis population, risks of adverse pregnancy outcomes increase. Vaginal discharge is common during pregnancy but is not an indicator of bacterial vaginosis or abnormal Lactobacillus-dominated microbiota. The treatment of abnormal vaginal microbiota populations with lactobacilli and estriol during pregnancy was found to restore the microbiota to a normal state.

Bacterial vaginosis and pregnancy

Bacterial vaginosis in pregnancy is an alteration of the normal vaginal microbiota of pregnancy. Intrauterine infections in pregnancy are caused by bacteria that cause inflammation.  The women may experience few or no symptoms. This sometimes leads to chorioamnionitis and other negative pregnancy outcomes. Chorioamnionitis is due to the presence of microbes like ureaplasma and mycoplasma species this generates the release of proinflammatory cytokines and chemokines, IL-8 which causes cervical ripening and can result in premature birth.  When there are high bacterial counts in of the vagina during pregnancy is typically due to the presence of the following organisms:
 G. vaginalis
 F. nucleatum
 Staphylococci  spp
 Streptococci
 Atopobium vaginae
 Mobiluncus spp
 Mycoplasma spp
 Bacteroides ureolyticus
 Fusobacterium

History
Investigations into reproductive-associated microbiomes began around 1885 by Theodor Escherich. He wrote that meconium from the newborn was free of bacteria. This was interpreted as the uterine environment was sterile. Other investigations used sterile diapers for meconium collection. No bacteria were able to be cultured from the samples. Bacteria were detected and were directly proportional to the time between birth and the passage of meconium.

References

Further reading

 A Metagenomic Approach to Characterization of the Vaginal Microbiome Signature in Pregnancy. Kjersti Aagaard, Kevin Riehle, Jun Ma, Nicola Segata, Toni-Ann Mistretta, Cristian Coarfa, Sabeen Raza, Sean Rosenbaum, Ignatia Van den Veyver, Aleksandar Milosavljevic, Dirk Gevers, Curtis Huttenhower, Joseph Petrosino, James Versalovic. PLoS ONE volume 7, issue 6. (2012)  

Abdominal pain
Bacterial diseases
Bacteriology
Chlamydia infections
Feminine hygiene
Microbiology
Sexually transmitted diseases and infections
Vagina
Gram-positive bacteria
Bacterial vaginosis
Microbiomes